The Survivors Foundation (Fundación Sobrevivientes) is an NGO located in Guatemala that aims to provide emotional, social and legal assistance to hundreds of women victims of violence, looking for justice and protection. The association is composed of women survivors of violence. It was founded in 2003 by Norma Cruz, women's rights activist.

History

The start 

In 1999, Claudia Maria Hernandez Cruz, victim of sexual violence, started a struggle with justice. Together with her daughter, Norma Cruz wandered from institution to institution seeking to strengthen the complaint, obtain support, learn procedures, courses of action and get legal support. They faced a distressing reality. Sexual abuse was not characterized as such. The sentences were minimal and these crimes were not relevant to the justice system where stereotypes and paradigms were prevailing. Violence against women was normal.

Emergence as an association 

In a waiting room of the Public Ministry of Guatemala, Norma and her daughter met a child victim of rape. Claudia Maria, shocked by such impunity, proposed to her mother to do something. That was the time when the concept that would give life, years later to the Foundation Sobrevivientes, began to take shape.  At that time, Claudia Maria and Norma, with what they had learned, began a process of very basic assistance to the small boy and his mother.

Other women joined the initiative. Persons wanting to help, lawyers and psychologists began to build solidarity and raise their voices around the issue. The Public Ministry of Guatemala, the National Civil Police and other institutions began to give them cases requiring assistance. A small office of 5 square meters opened, where legal advice, psychotherapy and social work were given. In January 2003, the initiative adopted the legal form of Association and became Sobrevivientes.

Justice in the case of Claudia 

Claudia Hernandez's case received a verdict. Her stepfather was sentenced to twenty years in prison. This was an achievement in a country where a sentence of this level was unthinkable.

From association to foundation 

The case of Claudia gave hope and caused an accumulation of cases, demanding attention and funds. In order to save resources Norma Cruz moved the office to her home, a small house in Zone 1 of Guatemala City. The home office also became a shelter for children victims of sexual abuse or incest, and for women victims of rape, domestic violence or attempted murder, seeking refuge. Those days were difficult as resources were depleted soon. For the same reason, Norma Cruz sold valuables and raised money with her friends. In June 2006, the association became the Foundation Sobrevivientes.

Since its creation 

According to the United States Department of State, in 2007, the Survivors Foundation helped to find, prosecute, and convict 30 individuals accused of murdering women.

The Survivors Foundation also strives to protect mothers whose babies are stolen: the first step in the supply chain of the lucrative and illegal international adoption business. The Survivors Foundation has given voice to hundreds of victims of domestic violence and sexual abuse and the families of murdered women. It has generated reforms and has inspired other groups and individuals inside and outside of Guatemala, to turn the tide of violence and impunity in the country of Central America.

Awards 

In 2009, the U.S. Department of State honored Norma Cruz as an International Woman of Courage. It was stated that Norma Cruz was "an inspiration and symbol of courage and hope for women in Guatemala and women around the world who are working for positive change." She received the award from the U.S. Secretary of State Hillary Clinton and from the First Lady Michelle Obama.
In 2011, Norma Cruz received the decoration of Chevalier of the Legion of Honor from the French Ambassador to Guatemala.

Threats 

Since May 2009, Norma Cruz and her family have been subjected to repeated threats of rape and murder by text messages and phone. Although the government of Guatemala has provided police protection, threats followed. This led Amnesty International to designate their work as a "priority case" in 2011.
In March 2011, the offices in the department of Chiquimula were damaged by a firebomb. No one was injured in the attack.

Objectives of the Foundation Sobrevivientes

Mission 

Eradicate all forms of violence against women, fighting against impunity and providing legal support to victims, counseling and special programs to help them live a better life.

Specific 

 Contribute to improve the judicial system through proposals regarding security issues, legislation, access to justice, to help to create public policies to prevent, punish and eradicate violence against women and children.
 Assist the victims in seeking justice.
 Improve their physical, mental and social development through comprehensive care.
 Monitor the compliance with international commitments towards women and children's human rights, and on the elimination of violence against women and children.
 Raise awareness and educate the public.

References

External links 
 Official website of Sobrevivientes

Organizations established in 2003
Women's rights organizations
Human rights organizations based in Guatemala
Foundations based in Guatemala